Barbara Heeb (born 13 February 1969 in Appenzell) is a Swiss road racing cyclist.

In 1996 Heeb won the world championship and finished 8th place in the road race at the Summer Olympics. She was the Swiss National Road Race champion in 1990, 1997 and 1998.

References

External links
 

1969 births
Living people
Swiss female cyclists
Cyclists at the 1992 Summer Olympics
Cyclists at the 1996 Summer Olympics
Cyclists at the 2004 Summer Olympics
Olympic cyclists of Switzerland
People from Appenzell Innerrhoden
UCI Road World Champions (women)